The Malaysia national under-18 and under-19 basketball team is a national basketball team of Malaysia, governed by the Malaysia Basketball Association.
It represents the country in international under-18 and under-19 (under age 18 and under age 19) basketball competitions.

See also
Malaysia national basketball team
Malaysia men's national under-17 basketball team
Malaysia women's national under-19 basketball team

References

External links
 Archived records of Malaysia team participations

Basketball teams in Malaysia
Men's national under-19 basketball teams
Basketball